Uhorská Ves is a village and municipality in Liptovský Mikuláš District in the Žilina Region of northern Slovakia.

History 
In historical records the village was first mentioned in 1230.

Geography 
The municipality lies at an altitude of 611 metres and covers an area of 4.452 km². It has a population of about 433 people.

External links 
 http://www.statistics.sk/mosmis/eng/run.html

Villages and municipalities in Liptovský Mikuláš District